The Pinnaroo railway line may refer to:

the Pinnaroo railway line, South Australia from Tailem Bend
the Pinnaroo railway line, Victoria from Ouyen
the entire line from Tailem Bend to Ouyen across the state border